Guo Guangchang (born February 1967) is a Chinese businessman and investor. He is the chairman and co-founder of Fosun International Limited, and a representative of the 12th Chinese People's Political Consultative Conference. According to Hurun Report's 2019 China Rich List he was the 45th richest person in China. As of 2022 he has a net worth of 3.8 Billion.

Early life and education
Guo Guangchang was born in Dongyang, Zhejiang, in 1967. In 1989, Guo received a BA in Philosophy and an MBA from Fudan University.

Career

Guangxin Technology Development Company Ltd.
In 1992, Guo founded Guangxin Technology Development Company Ltd, with friends Liang Zinjun and Tan Jian, which was among the first to use scientific methods in market research in mainland China.

Fosun Group
See main article Fosun International
Since 1994, Guo has been the chairman of Fosun Group and invested in insurance, pharmaceuticals and healthcare, property, steel, mining, retail, services, finance and other investment, and asset management, creating one of the largest non-state owned enterprises in China. Fosun International employs over 74,000 people.

In 2007, Fosun International (00656.HK), the holding company of Fosun, was listed on the HKSE. Fosun has teamed up with IFC in reinsurance business, invested in Club Med of France, insurance company Fidelidade Seguros of Portugal and Folli Follie of Greece to jointly explore opportunities brought by the growth of China's economy.

In July 2016 Guo’s Fosun International purchased the Wolverhampton Wanderers Football Club a professional association football club based in Wolverhampton, West Midlands, England for a reported £45 million from previous owner Steve Morgan, Wolves went on to clinch the 2017–18 Championship title, to return to the Premier League after a 6-year absence. Wanderers's return to the Premier League resulted in a seventh-place finish in their first season back, their highest placing in the top division since finishing sixth in 1979–80.This position also earned them a place in the Europa League and their first European campaign since 1980–81.

Chairmanships and memberships
Guo is a member of the National Committee of the 12th Chinese People's Political Consultative Conference, a member of the Standing Committee of All-China Federation of Industry and Commerce, a member of the Standing Committee of All-China Youth Federation, the Honorary Chairman of Shanghai Zhejiang Chamber of Commerce.

Shanghai World Expo
At the 2010 Shanghai World Expo, Guo, together with 15 other Chinese entrepreneurs, funded the Chinese Private Enterprise Pavilion, which was the debut of China's non-state-owned enterprises in World Expo.

Wealth
As of 2019 he was listed as the 50th richest person in China by Forbes, with a net worth of $6.5 billion. He has been called "China’s Warren Buffett".

Recognition and awards 
In 2017 Guo was honored with the 16th Asia Business Leaders Awards’ Lifetime Achievement Award by CNBC. He received the 2016/17 “Nobel Laureates Series-Asian Chinese Leaders Award” by Asian College of Knowledge Management,  and the “Lifetime Achievement Award” at the 8th World Chinese Economic Summit in 2016.

Philanthropy
Guo is the vice chairperson of China Glory Society, China Social Entrepreneur Foundation and Youth Business China Foundation. Through the auspices of the Fosun Foundation, Guo has donated an aggregate of up to 600 million RMB to charity causes to help fight poverty, improve access to education and provide natural disaster relief.

Investigation
On 11 December 2015, it was reported that Guo has been detained by police, was "assisting authorities with an investigation", and had been "linked to a corruption court case in August". It has been speculated that he may have been caught up in Party General Secretary Xi Jinping’s anti-corruption efforts. This has led to shares in his Hong Kong-listed subsidiary being suspended. On 14 December, Guo was released and appeared at Fosun's annual meeting in Shanghai. It was Guo's first public event since he was "assisting the investigation".

References

External links
 Fosun International Limited
 "Guo Guangchang, "China Rich List, Forbes magazine, 2002
 Bio, ChinaVitae.com, retrieved December 11, 2007
 Bio, China Radio International (CRIEnglish.com), January 13, 2005, retrieved December 12, 2007

1967 births
Living people
21st-century Chinese businesspeople
Billionaires from Zhejiang
Businesspeople from Zhejiang
Chinese company founders
Chinese investors
Chinese philanthropists
Chinese real estate businesspeople
Fosun International people
Fudan University alumni
People's Republic of China politicians from Zhejiang
People from Dongyang
Politicians from Jinhua
Members of the 12th Chinese People's Political Consultative Conference